Anathallis jordanensis is a species of orchid plant native to Brazil.

References 

jordanensis
Flora of Brazil